Justin Gimelstob and Nathan Healey were the defending champions, but Gimelstob did not participate this year.  Healey partnered Ashley Fisher, losing in the first round.

Mario Ančić and Mahesh Bhupathi won the title, defeating Michael Berrer and Kenneth Carlsen 6–4, 6–3 in the final.

Seeds

Draw

Draw

External links
Draw

2006 ATP Tour
2006 China Open (tennis)